Tunstall railway station was located on the Potteries Loop Line and served the town of Tunstall, Staffordshire. The station closed down along with the Potteries Loop Line in 1964.

The station has been demolished and the site is now part of the Potteries Greenway, although the station master's house is still in existence, located on the A527 road.

References

Disused railway stations in Stoke-on-Trent
Railway stations in Great Britain closed in 1964
Railway stations in Great Britain opened in 1873
Former North Staffordshire Railway stations
Beeching closures in England